In software engineering, a binade is a set of numbers in a binary IEEE 754 floating-point format that all have the same exponent. In other words, a binade is the interval [2n, 2n+1) for some integer value of n.

Further reading
 "Number of solutions to A2 + B2 = C2 + C in a binade," HAL
 "Idempotent Binary → Decimal → Binary Conversion," Prof. W. Kahan, 

Computer arithmetic